The Anderson Park District (officially the Anderson Township Park District) is the park district of Anderson Township, Hamilton County, Ohio, United States. The district's main park is Juilfs Park.

Parks
Beech Acres Park
Clear Creek Park
Johnson Hills Park
Juilfs Park
Kellogg Park
Laverty Park
Riverside Park
Veterans Park

See also
 Great Parks of Hamilton County

References

External links
 Official website

Park districts in Ohio
Protected areas of Hamilton County, Ohio